Micranthaxia rediviva is a fossil species of beetle in the family Buprestidae, the only species in the genus Micranthaxia.

References

Monotypic Buprestidae genera